Metallocrates is a genus of moth in the family Blastobasidae. It contains the single species Metallocrates transformata, which is found in Brazil.

References

Blastobasidae genera
Monotypic moth genera
Moths of South America